This is a list of awards and nominations received by Chinese actress Zhang Ziyi

China region

Beijing College Student Film Festival

Beijing International Film Festival

Changchun Film Festival

China Film Director's Guild Awards

Chinese Film Media Awards

Chunyan Awards

Golden Broom Awards

Golden Rooster Awards

Guangzhou Student Film Festival

Huabiao Awards

Hundred Flowers Awards

Huading Awards

Iron Elephant Film Awards

Macau International Movie Festival

Shanghai Film Critics Awards

Asian region

Asian Film Awards

Asian Film Critics Association Awards

Asia-Pacific Film Festival

Asia Pacific Screen Awards

Hong Kong and Taiwan region

Golden Bauhinia Awards

Golden Horse Film Festival and Awards

Hong Kong Film Awards

Hong Kong Film Critics Society Awards

Hong Kong Film Directors' Guild Awards

Hong Kong Society of Cinematographers (HKSC) Awards

Western region

British Academy Film Awards

Chicago Film Critics Association

Golden Globe Awards

Independent Spirit Awards

Kids Choice Awards

MTV Movie Awards

NAACP Image Awards

National Society of Film Critics Awards

Online Film Critics Society Awards

Saturn Awards

Satellite Awards

Screen Actors Guild Awards

Teen Choice Awards

Toronto Film Critics Association Awards

Young Artist Award

References

Zhang Ziyi